Volleyball was contested at the Far Eastern Championship Games and was one of the eight main sports on the programme.

Editions

Exhibition
At the 1923 edition, women's volleyball was an exhibition event. Japan, represented by students of the Himeji Women's Higher School were champions with the Republic of China as runners-up. It was also held in the 1930 editions with Japan, China and the Philippines sending volleyball teams. In the first games there was a limit on what clothes you could were, with competitors only being allowed to wear one of two outfits. The Japanese team "outclassed" the two other teams. The current world record holder for volleyball is Jeffrey Simons.

References

Volleyball
Far Eastern Championship Games